Olufemi Anthony Olujobi (born March 5, 1996) is an American professional basketball player for the Kaohsiung Steelers of the P. League+. He played college basketball at Oakland Golden Grizzlies from 2014 to 2016, North Carolina A&T from 2017 to 2018 and DePaul Blue from 2018 to 2019.

College career
As a senior at DePaul Blue in 2018-19 Olujobi averaged 12.7 points, 4.3 rebounds and 1.2 assists in 26.5 minutes in 36 appearances.

Professional career
After graduating, in summer 2019, Olujobi signed with Lietkabelis of Lietuvos krepšinio lyga. On his debut against Keravnos, he played 4 minutes and achieved 2 rebounds and 2 assists. On February 12, 2020, he signed with Macedonian basketball champion MZT Skopje 

On August 27, 2021, he has signed with ESSM Le Portel of the LNB Pro A.

References

External links
Eurobasket.com Profile
DePaul Profile
Proballers Profile

1996 births
Living people
American expatriate basketball people in Lithuania
American expatriate basketball people in North Macedonia
American men's basketball players
BC Lietkabelis players
DePaul Blue Demons men's basketball
ESSM Le Portel players
KK MZT Skopje players
Power forwards (basketball)
Basketball players from New York (state)
People from Brentwood, New York
Oakland Golden Grizzlies men's basketball players
North Carolina A&T Aggies men's basketball players
American expatriate basketball people in Taiwan